Piazzolla may refer to:

People
 Astor Piazzolla (1921–1992), Argentine tango composer, bandoneon player, and arranger
 Margherita Piazzolla Beloch (1879–1976), Italian mathematician
 Paola Piazzolla (born 1996), Italian lightweight rower

Places
 12102 Piazzolla, an asteroid discovered by F. B. Zoltowski on May 5, 1998
 Astor Piazzolla International Airport, an airport serving Mar del Plata, an Atlantic coastal city in the Buenos Aires Province of Argentina